David Mohammed (born 2 November 1965) is a Trinidadian cricketer. He played in nineteen first-class and seven List A matches for Trinidad and Tobago from 1984 to 1991.

See also
 List of Trinidadian representative cricketers

References

External links
 

1965 births
Living people
Trinidad and Tobago cricketers